2016 Hockey Champions Trophy may refer to:

 2016 Men's Hockey Champions Trophy
 2016 Women's Hockey Champions Trophy